Agar Tum Na Hotay is a 2014 Pakistani television series that aired on Hum TV. It is directed by Fahim Burney and written by Gazala Aziz. The series was produced by Syed Afzal Ali at Mushroom Productions. It starred Saniya Shamshad, Kanwar Arsalan and Hassan Ahmed in pivot roles. At 3rd Hum Awards series was nominated Best Soap Actor for Hassan Ahmed, Best Soap Actress for Saniya Shamshad and Best Soap Series for Syed Afzal Ali.

Cast

 Saniya Shamshad as Sania 
 Kanwar Arsalan  
 Hassan Ahmed  
 Shaheen Khan as Shakra
 Uroosa Qureshi  
 Mariam Ansari
 Naeema Garaj
 Yasir Shuro

Accolades 

At 3rd Hum Awards soap was nominated for following nominations:

 Best Soap Actor - Hassan Ahmed (nom) 
 Best Soap Actress - Saniya Shamshad (nom)
 Best Soap Series - Syed Afzal Ali (nom)

References

External links 

 official website 
 

2014 Pakistani television series debuts
2014 Pakistani television series endings
Pakistani drama television series
Urdu-language television shows
Hum TV original programming